The 1943 California Golden Bears football team was an American football team that represented the University of California, Berkeley as a member of the Pacific Coast Conference (PCC) during the 1943 college football season. Led by ninth-year head coach Stub Allison, the team compiled an overall record of 4–6 with a 2–2 mark in conference play, finishing second in the PCC.

Schedule

References

California
California Golden Bears football seasons
California Golden Bears football